"Popsicles and Icicles" is a song written by David Gates and performed by The Murmaids.  The single was arranged by Nestor La Bonte and produced by Kim Fowley.

Chart performance
It reached No. 2 on the Middle-Road Singles chart, No. 3 on the Billboard Hot 100 and Cash Box Top 100, and No. 12 in Australia in 1964.
"Popsicles and Icicles" was ranked No. 31 on Cash Boxs "Top 100 Chart Hits of 1964".

Other versions
Percy Faith and His Orchestra on his 1964 EP More Themes for Young Lovers.
Billy Vaughn on his 1964 album Blue Velvet & 1963's Great Hits.
The Boone Girls on the 2017 re-release of the 1977 Debby Boone's album You Light Up My Life.

References

1963 songs
1963 debut singles
Songs written by David Gates
Percy Faith songs
Debby Boone songs